Sasa (Japanese:  or ), also called broad-leaf bamboo, is a genus of running bamboo. These species have at most one branch per node.

Selected species
 Sasa borealis (Hack.) Makino & Shibata – northern bamboo, Jirisan bamboo
 Sasa kagamiana
 Sasa kurilensis (Rupr.) Makino & Shibata – chishimazasa, Kuril bamboo, Korean bamboo
 Sasa nagimontana – muroi
 Sasa nipponica (Makino) Makino & Shibata
 Sasa oshidensis
 Sasa palmata (Burb.) E.G.Camus – broad-leaf bamboo
 Sasa senanensis
 Sasa tsuboiana
 Sasa veitchii – kumazasa

Fossil record
Fossil leaves of †Sasa kodorica are described from the Pliocene of Kodori Valley in Abkazia.

See also
Pseudosasa – another genus of bamboo

References

Bambusoideae
Bambusoideae genera
Garden plants of Asia